Russian ballet is a form of ballet characteristic of or originating from Russia.

Imperial Russian Ballet
Until 1689, ballet in Russia was nonexistent (ballet has its origins in the courts of the Italian Renaissance in the 15th and 16th centuries.) The Tsarist control and isolationism in Russia allowed for little influence from the West. It wasn't until the rise of Peter the Great that Russian society opened up to the West. St. Petersburg was erected to embrace the West and compete against Moscow's isolationism. Peter the Great created a new Russia which rivaled the society of the West with magnificent courts and palaces. His vision was to challenge the west. Classical ballet entered the realm of Russia not as entertainment, but as a "standard of physical comportment to be emulated and internalized – an idealized way of behaving." The aim was not to entertain the masses of Russians, but to cultivate new Russian people. 

Empress Anna (1730–1740) was devoted to ostentatious amusements (balls, fireworks, tableaux), and in the summer of 1734 ordered the appointment of Jean-Baptiste Landé as dancing master in the military academy she had founded in 1731 for sons of the nobility. In 1738, he became ballet master and head of the new ballet school, launching the advanced study of ballet in Russia, and winning the patronage of elite families.

France provided many leaders such as Charles Didelot in St. Petersburg (1801–1831),  Jules Perrot (1848–1859) and Arthur Saint-Léon (1859–1869).

In the early 19th century, the theaters were opened up to anyone who could afford a ticket. A seating section called a rayok, or 'paradise gallery', consisted of simple wooden benches. This allowed non-wealthy people access to the ballet, because tickets in this section were inexpensive.

One author describes the Imperial ballet as "unlike that of any other country in the world ..." The most prestigious of the ballet troupes were those attached to the state-supported theatres. The directors of these companies were personally appointed by the tsar, and all the dancers were, in a sense, Imperial servants. In the theatre, the men in the audience always remained standing until the tsar entered his box and, out of respect, after the performance, they remained in their places until he had departed. Curtain calls were arranged according to a strict pattern: first, the ballerina bowed to the tsar's box, then to that of the theater director, and finally to the general public.

Ballets Russes 
By the early 1900s, the Russian ballet went beyond its borders and infiltrated Paris. It had become its own force and was distinctly Russian, while still being embraced by the Parisian society. In 1903 Ivan Clustine, a Russian dancer and choreographer who had started his career at the Bolshoi Theatre, was appointed Maître de ballet at the Paris Opera. Clustine's hiring promoted a frenzy of questions about his nationality and choreographic agenda: "His hiring was thought a direct attempt by the Opera to imitate the Russian company; even he thought as much, maintaining, not without despondency, that inspiration too often came from the north: 'A revolution! A method that people often apply in the country of the tsars.' Clustine, although acknowledging his nationality with pride, harbored none of the revolutionary intentions that some thought an inevitable consequence of being Russian."

The Parisians, while denying adoption of the backwards Russian troupe, had distinct Russian influence in their theater. "Despite Clustine's protestations, several features of the Opera's post-1909 ballets, along with its institutional conventions and balletic policy, appeared to betray a Russian influence." The stigma of Russian brutality and force was applied even in Paris. While their style was not only being accepted in Paris, but implemented in Paris theaters, the Ballets Russes were still considered dangerous, even in the theatre of performing art. "The Ballets Russes, at base, became a metaphor for invasion, an eternal force that could engulf and control, could penetrate the membrane of French society, culture and even art itself." The embracing of Russian ballet in the Paris society became a point of contention and French nationalism collided with Russian determination.  Questions arose about the Russian intention in the Paris theaters under the title "cultural politics" including "the delimitation of boundaries, the preservation of identity and the nature of relational engagements."

Russia was incapable of simply bringing Russian culture to the West, but created a paranoia of intentions wherever they went.  In the beginning, the relationship between Russia and France through the arts was a testimony to their political allegiances. "French critics acknowledged a shared choreographic heritage:  French ballet had migrated to Russia in the nineteenth century, only to return, decades later, under the guise of the Ballets Russes.  The company, then, moored in a history that intertwined both nations, not only contributed to a cultural programme of exchange. The Ballets Russes were a testament to Franco-Russian cooperation, goodwill and support; they represented un nouveau resserrement de l'alliance (a further strengthening of the alliance)."  However, the relationship made a negative turn when duplicity amongst the alliance arose.  While Russia continued to borrow money from the French banks, "the Russians no longer interested in supporting French culture and colonial politics."   his duplicity gave fuel for the paranoia and lack of trust we see in the relationship concerning the arts. The Parisian press spoke of the Ballets Russes in terms of both "enchantement', 'bouleversement' and 'fantaisie'.  Yet they also invoked metaphors of invasion, describing the company's Parisian presence in terms of assaut ('onslaught') and conquete ('conquest')." The dual-faceted relationship can be seen in this expression of both enrapture and contention. One French journalist, Maurice Lefevre, called on his fellow Parisians to see the reality of the Russian invasion as though it was an infestation: "We need to do some soul-searching and ask whether our guests are not about to become our masters." To imply that Russia was about to take over France through performing arts seems to be irrational, but evidence would suggest the fears were real among those in Paris.

Ballet companies
The first ballet company was the Imperial School of Ballet in St. Petersburg in the 1740s. Sergey Diaghilev, (1872–1929), an enormously important figure in the Russian ballet scene, founded the ballet company Ballets Russes in 1909. Diaghilev intervened in every aspect of ballet – direction, production, lighting, scenery, and performance. He headquartered his ballet company in Paris. A protégé of Diaghilev, George Balanchine, founded the New York City Ballet in 1948. Today, the Kirov Ballet company (now known as the Mariinsky Ballet) and the Bolshoi company are two world-renowned Russian ballet companies that tour the world.
Mariinsky Ballet (formerly Kirov ballet)
Bolshoi Ballet

Other Russian ballet companies include:

Ballets Russes, founded in 1909
Moscow State Academy of Choreography, commonly known as The Bolshoi Ballet Academy, founded in 1773
Vaganova Academy of Russian Ballet, founded in 1738 as the Imperial Ballet School
Saint Petersburg Eifman Ballet, founded in 1977
Mikhailovsky Theatre Ballet, founded in the 1930s
Perm Theatre Ballet, founded in 1896
Novosibirsk Theatre Ballet, founded in 1945
Russian State Ballet of Siberia, founded in 1978

A number of companies have been called, or included in their name, Moscow Ballet.

Methods
Several methods exist in Russian ballet. The most widely used is the Vaganova method, named after the ballerina and teacher, Agrippina Vaganova.

Notable dancers

Many Russian dancers have gone on to reach worldwide acclaim. Notable Russian dancers include:

Notable Russian ballets
The Pharaoh's Daughter (1862)
The Little Humpbacked Horse (1864)
Le Roi Candaule (1868)
Don Quixote (1869)La Bayadère (1877)The Sleeping Beauty (ballet) (1890)The Nutcracker (1892)The Awakening of Flora (1894)Swan Lake (1895)Raymonda (1898)Harlequinade (1900)The Firebird (1910)Romeo and Juliet (1940)Cinderella (1945)

See also
 Bolshoi Ballet
 Glossary of ballet terms
 List of the main ballet masters of the Saint Petersburg State Ballet
 Mariinsky Ballet
 Vaganova method

References

Bibliography

Anderson, Jack. (1992).  Ballet and Modern Dance:  A Concise History.  New Jersey:  Princeton Book Company.
 Andre, Paul; Arkadyev, V. (1999) Great History of Russian Ballet: Its Art & Choreography (1999).
Caddy, Davinia.  (2012). The Ballets Russes and Beyond:  Music and Dance in Belle-Epoque Paris.  Cambridge:  Cambridge University Press.
 Cross, Samuel H. (1944) "The Russian Ballet Before Dyagilev." Slavonic and East European Review. American Series 3.4 (1944): 19-49. in JSTOR
Curtis, Glenn E, ed. (1996). Russia: A Country Study. Washington: GPO for the Library of Congress.
 Homans, Jennifer, (2010).  Apollo's Angels: A History of Ballet.  New York: Random House.
 Johnson, Alfred Edwin. (1913) The Russian Ballet (Houghton Mifflin) online
 Lifar, Serge. (1954). A history of Russian ballet from its origins to the present day (Hutchinson)
 Lobenthal, Joel. (2016) Alla Osipenko: Beauty and Resistance in Soviet Ballet (Oxford University Press)
 Norton, Leslie. (2004) Léonide Massine and the 20th century ballet (McFarland)
 Propert, Walter Archibald. (1972) The Russian Ballet in Western Europe, 1909–1920. B. Blom
Roslavleva, Natalia. (1966). Era of the Russian Ballet, New York: E.P. Dutton & Co., Inc.
 Surit͡s, E. I͡A, and E. I︠A︡ Surit︠s︡. (1990) Soviet Choreographers in the 1920s (Duke University Press, 1990).
 Wiley, Roland John. (1990) A century of Russian ballet: documents and accounts, 1810-1910 (Oxford University Press)
Willis-Aarino, Peggy. (2002). Agrippina Vaganova (1879–1951): Her Place in the History of Ballet and Her Impact on the Future of Classical Dance,'' Lewiston, New York: Edwin Mellen Press.

External links

 Russian ballet
 Russian Ballet Company 
 The Pennsylvania Academy of Ballet, a Vaganova method school
 BBT/School of Russian American Ballet in Brooklyn, NY, USA
 The Russian Ballet Academy of Indiana, a professional Vaganova method school 
 Russian ballet today: Who's who in Russian ballet – a professional community website with discussions, video channel, photos etc

 
Ballet styles
History of ballet